2035 Stearns, provisional designation , is a bright Hungaria asteroid and sizable Mars-crosser inside the inner regions of the asteroid belt, approximately  in diameter. It was discovered on 21 September 1973, by American astronomer James Gibson at the Leoncito Astronomical Complex in Argentina. The transitional E-type asteroid has a long rotation period of 93 hours. It was named after American astronomer Carl Leo Stearns.

Orbit and classification 

Stearns is a dynamical Hungaria asteroid, a large group that forms the innermost dense concentration of asteroids in the Solar System. It is also a Mars-crossing asteroid, a member of the dynamically unstable group, located between the main belt and near-Earth populations, and crossing the orbit of Mars at 1.666 AU.

The asteroid orbits the Sun in the inner main-belt at a distance of 1.64–2.13 AU once every 2 years and 7 months (945 days; semi-major axis of 1.88 AU). Its orbit has an eccentricity of 0.13 and an inclination of 28° with respect to the ecliptic.

The body's observation arc begins with a precovery taken at Palomar Observatory in January 1954, nearly 20 years prior to its official discovery observation at Leoncito.

Physical characteristics 

In the Tholen classification, Stearns is a bright E-type asteroid. while in the SMASS classification and Bus-DeMeo taxonomy, it is an Xe-subtype that transitions from the X-type to the E-type.

Rotation period 

Several rotational lightcurve of Stearns have been obtained from photometric observations since 1988. Analysis of the best-rated lightcurve by Robert Stephens at the Center for Solar System Studies  gave a rotation period of 93 hours with a brightness amplitude of 0.20 magnitude. This makes the asteroid as close slow rotator.

Diameter and albedo 

According to the survey carried out by the NEOWISE mission of NASA's Wide-field Infrared Survey Explorer, Stearns measures between 4.82 and 6.00 kilometers in diameter and its surface has an albedo between 0.443 and 0.65. The Collaborative Asteroid Lightcurve Link assumes a standard albedo for members of the Hungaria family of 0.40, and derives a diameter of 5.28 kilometers based on an absolute magnitude of 13.0.

Naming 

This minor planet was named after Carl Leo Stearns (1892–1972), American astronomer at Wesleyan University and Van Vleck Observatory who measured a large number of stellar parallaxes. The official  was published by the Minor Planet Center on 1 November 1978. The lunar crater Stearns was also named in his honor.

Notes

References

External links 
 Asteroid Lightcurve Database (LCDB), query form (info )
 Dictionary of Minor Planet Names, Google books
 Discovery Circumstances: Numbered Minor Planets (1)-(5000) – Minor Planet Center
 
 

002035
002035
Discoveries by James B. Gibson (astronomer)
Named minor planets
002035
002035
19730921